Madalum, officially the Municipality of Madalum (Maranao: Inged a Madalum), is a 3rd class municipality in the province of Lanao del Sur, Philippines. According to the 2020 census, it has a population of 26,478 people.

Geography

Barangays
Madalum is politically subdivided into 38 barangays.

Climate

Demographics

Economy

Government

Mayors under the 5th Republic

References

External links
 Madalum Profile at the DTI Cities and Municipalities Competitive Index
 [ Philippine Standard Geographic Code]
 Philippine Census Information

Municipalities of Lanao del Sur
Populated places on Lake Lanao